Valery Borisovich Garkalin (11 April 1954 – 20 November 2021) was a Soviet and Russian theater and film actor. He was awarded the People's Artist of the Russian Federation in 2008. Garkalin was also a professor of GITIS.

Personal life 
He was married to Yekaterina from 1978 until her death in 2009. His daughter Nika is active in theatrical production. His son-in-law is an actor of the Theatre of Nations Pavel Akimkin. Garkalin became a grandfather in 2012 when his daughter gave birth to a son named Timofey.

Garkalin was hospitalized with COVID-19 in Kommunarka on 2 October 2021, during the COVID-19 pandemic in Russia. He died from complications of COVID-19 on 20 November 2021.

Selected filmography 
 Katala (1989)  as Aleksei Grekov
 Tsar Ivan the Terrible (1991) as Vaska Gryaznoy
 Russian Symphony (1994) as Borisych
 What a Mess! (1995) as  Vasily Krolikov, Innokentiy Shniperson, Roman Almazov and Patrick Crolikow
 Poor Sasha (1997) as Nikolay Kryshkin
 House for the Rich (2000) as captain Skorokhodov
 Silver Lily of the Valley (2000) as Roman Kromin
 Yeralash (2004—2006) as cameo
 Fitil (2004—2006) as cameo
 My Fair Nanny (2004) as writer Francois Lyapen
 Popsa (2005) as  Lev Malinovsky
 One Night of Love (2008)  as Monsieur Charles, Fencing Teacher

Awards 
 Kinoshock (1995) —  Award for Best Actor
 Honored Artist of the Russian Federation (2000)   for merits in the field of art
 People's Artist of Russia (2008)

References

External links 
 
 Неофициальный сайт Валерия Гаркалина

1954 births
2021 deaths
Male actors from Moscow
Russian male film actors
Soviet male film actors
Russian male stage actors
Soviet male stage actors
Russian male television actors
People's Artists of Russia
Honored Artists of the Russian Federation
Russian Academy of Theatre Arts alumni
20th-century Russian male actors
21st-century Russian male actors
Deaths from the COVID-19 pandemic in Russia